The 2017 Iranian Futsal 2nd Division will be divided into three phases.

The league will also be composed of 32 teams divided into four divisions. All divisions of 8 teams, whose teams will be divided geographically. Teams will play only other teams in their own division, once at home and once away for a total of 14 matches each.

Teams

Group 1

Group 2

Group 3

Group 4

Number of teams by region

Preliminary round

Group 1

Group 2

Group 3

Group 4

Main round 
Last updated: 11 August 2017

Group A (Saqqez)

Group B (Urmia)

See also 
 2016–17 Iranian Futsal Super League
 2016–17 Futsal 1st Division
 2016–17 Persian Gulf Cup
 2016–17 Azadegan League
 2016–17 Iran Football's 2nd Division
 2016–17 Iran Football's 3rd Division
 2016–17 Hazfi Cup

References 

Iran Futsal's 2nd Division seasons
3
3